Alfredo de los Santos (born October 17, 1969) is a Dominican-American Para-cyclist. He represented the United States in the 2016 and 2020 Summer Paralympics. In the latter, he won a bronze medal in the mixed team relay H1–5.

De los Santos previously served in the United States Army.

References

1969 births
Living people
Sportspeople from Santo Domingo
American amputees
American male cyclists
Cyclists at the 2016 Summer Paralympics
Cyclists at the 2020 Summer Paralympics
Medalists at the 2020 Summer Paralympics
Paralympic medalists in cycling
Paralympic bronze medalists for the United States
United States Army personnel of the War in Afghanistan (2001–2021)
Dominican Republic emigrants to the United States